Cucaita is a municipality in the Central Boyacá Province, part of Boyacá Department, Colombia. Cucaita borders Sora in the north, Tunja in the east and south and Samacá in the south and west.

Etymology 
The name Cucaita is derived from Chibcha and means either "Seminary enclosure" or "Shade of the farming fields".

History 
The area of Cucaita in the times before the Spanish conquest was inhabited by the Muisca, organised in their loose Muisca Confederation. Cucaita was ruled by the zaque of nearby Hunza.

Modern Cucaita was founded on August 12, 1556 by friar Juan de Los Barrios.

Economy 
Main economical activities of Cucaita are agriculture (predominantly onions and peas), livestock farming and minor carbon mining.

Born in Cucaita 
 Rafael Antonio Niño, former professional cyclist

Gallery

References

External links 

  Colombian ministry of culture; Cucaita, 450 years old

Municipalities of Boyacá Department
Populated places established in 1556
1556 establishments in the Spanish Empire
Muysccubun